Miluo may refer to the following in southern China:

Miluo City, county-level city of Yueyang, Hunan
Miluo River, in Jiangxi and Hunan